Scelotes mossambicus, the Mozambique dwarf burrowing skink, is a species of lizard which is found in South Africa, Mozambique, and Eswatini.

References

mossambicus
Reptiles of South Africa
Reptiles described in 1882
Taxa named by Wilhelm Peters